Tyrone Power (1914–1958) was an American actor. 

Tyrone Power may also refer to: 

 Tyrone Power (Irish actor) (1797–1841)
 Tyrone Power Sr. (1869–1931), British-born actor
 Tyrone Power Jr. (born 1959), actor
 Sir W. Tyrone Power (1819–1911), Australian artist and author